Undermining (also known as removal of the guard, or removing the defender) is a chess tactic in which a defensive piece is captured, leaving one of the opponent's pieces undefended or under-defended. The opponent has the unpalatable choice of recapturing or saving the undefended piece. A possible response is to sacrifice the piece whose defense was undermined before capturing the piece which just took the defender.

Example
Kramnik–Topalov in the seventh round of the 2004 Linares chess tournament reached the diagrammed position with White to play. The black knight on a4 is defended only by the black pawn on b5. White undermined the knight with 1. Bxb5. The game continued 1... Rxb5 2. Rxa4, with a net  gain of a pawn for White.

Black may attempt 1...Nxb2, disposing of the unguarded knight and hoping for 2.Kxb2 Rxb5+ to regain the lost pawn. After 2.Rb3, however, Black can only save the knight with 2…Rxb5 3.Rxb5, leaving White an exchange up instead of just a pawn.

See also
 Deflection (chess)

References

Chess tactics
Chess terminology